Martinus Schoonmaker (1737–1824) was a New York City clergyman.

Biography
He was born in Rochester, Ulster County, New York in 1737. He was licensed to preach in 1765, was pastor of the Dutch Reformed church at Gravesend for several years, and then of the one at Harlem till 1784, when he fixed his residence at Flatbush, and assumed charge of the six congregations in Kings County. During the Revolution he was an earnest and influential Whig. He was the last of the ministers that preached only in Dutch till the end of their lives. The church, six-sided and with a funnel-roof, in which he ministered at New Utrecht, is shown in the illustration. He died in Flatbush, New York in 1824.

References

1824 deaths
1737 births
American people of Dutch descent
 People from Rochester, New York
Clergy from New York City